Laurel Park Historic District is a historic district in Sarasota, Florida, United States. It is bounded by Morrill Street, Orange Avenue, Brother Geenen Way, Julia Place and Lafayette Court. On March 11, 2008, it was added to the U.S. National Register of Historic Places.

References

External links
Official site

National Register of Historic Places in Sarasota County, Florida
Historic districts on the National Register of Historic Places in Florida
Buildings and structures in Sarasota, Florida